Alejandra Onieva (born 1 June 1992) is a Spanish actress best known for appearing as Soledad Castro Montenegro in the long-running telenovela El secreto de Puente Viejo, and in the Spanish Netflix original series Alta Mar (High Seas).

Career
Born in Madrid, Spain, Onieva studied in the schools of interpretation Interactive Study and Fourth Wall. She started studying advertising, public relations and fashion but shortly thereafter she left her university because she had been selected to play one of the main roles in the daily series El secreto de Puente Viejo.

She has participated in the play Mezclando colores. El secreto de Puente Viejo was her first job as an actress on the small screen.

Beginning in 2015, she joined the cast of the planned Antena 3 series La sonrisa de las mariposas.

In 2017 she was part of the cast of the Telecinco series, Ella es tu padre with the actors Carlos Santos, María Castro and Rubén Cortada among others, the series was broadcast on 4 September 2017 with good acceptance, although it was declining to stop broadcasting instantaneously, due to low audience data, after the seventh episode of the series on 17 October 2017, until further notice. In July 2018 it was announced that the series would be broadcast in FDF to release the remaining chapters. At the end of the same year she premiered Presumed Guilty, together with Miguel Ángel Muñoz, on Antena 3.

In May 2019, the first season of the Spanish Netflix original series Alta Mar (High Seas) premiered, with Onieva and Jon Kortajarena as the leading couple.

Personal life
In July 2020, Onieva was reported to be dating actor Sebastian Stan.

References

External links
 

1992 births
Living people
Actresses from Madrid